is a Japanese 4-panel gag manga written and illustrated by Ohba-Kai. Tono to Issho parodies several historical figures from Japan's Sengoku period (Warring States Era). Tono to Issho was adapted into two anime television series and two original video animations.

Media

Manga 
Tono to Issho began its serialized run in the manga magazine Media Factory's Comic Flapper in 2006. The manga series parodies the exploits of several historical figures from Japan's Sengoku period (Warring States Era), such as Chousokabe Motochika, Date Masamune, Katakura Kagetsuna, Uesugi Kenshin, and Oda Nobunaga.

Original video animation 
In November 2009, an original video anime adaptation of Tono to Issho was announced. The anime adaptation was released on DVD on March 25, 2010. A second anime DVD was bundled with the fifth volume collection of the manga series released on August 23, 2010.

Anime television series 
After the release of the first original video anime DVD, an anime television adaptation was announced in the Mainichi Shimbun paper. The series, titled , featured 12 episodes of 1.5 minutes in length and was broadcast from July 6, 2010, to September 21, 2010. A second television series, titled , was announced in 2010. The second season also consists of 12 episodes, but the runtime was lengthened to 3.5 minutes and began its broadcast run on April 5, 2011. Both series are streamed by the media streaming website Crunchyroll to audiences in the United States, Canada, the United Kingdom, Ireland, Australia, New Zealand, Sweden, Denmark, Norway, Finland, Iceland, Netherlands, Singapore, Brazil, and Portugal.

Tono to Issho: Ippunkan Gekijōu

Tono to Issho: Gantai no Yabō

Reception 
During the Anime News Network's summer 2010 anime previews, Gia Manry commented that the first anime series would be a hard sell because of its focus on Japanese history, but that the comedy is largely based on famous historical figures saying silly things. Commenting on the second season, ANN reviewer Bamboo Dong states that it "break[s] up the monotony of the work day" and was good for a quick laugh. She also states that the writers of the second series have what it takes to translate the manga into a visual medium. In Otaku USAs preview of series being simulcast by Crunchyroll beginning in March 2011, it described Tono to Issho as a champion of the comedy genre.

References

External links 
  
 

Anime series based on manga
Comedy anime and manga
Gathering
Historical anime and manga
Kadokawa Dwango franchises
Media Factory manga
Seinen manga
Yomiuri Telecasting Corporation original programming